Yamaha CX5M is an MSX-system compatible computer that expands upon the normal features expected from these systems with a built-in eight-voice FM synthesizer module, introduced in 1984 by Yamaha Corporation.

This FM synth itself has stereo audio outputs, an input for a purpose-built four-octave keyboard, and a pair of MIDI Input/Output ports that could be used for normal MIDI on the second revision of the CX5M, but only used for management of data from a Yamaha DX7 on the first model.

Specification
The CX5M was built for the MSX standard, which included slots for inserting programmed cartridges. These cartridges extended the machine's capability, accepting a range of games, office applications and so on. Yamaha produced a range of cartridges for the system including a programmer for Yamaha's DX range of FM keyboards and a real-time sequencer. Two of these, the Voice Editor and Music Composer, allowed the user to program a bank of 48 sounds for the CX5M's own built-in synthesizer and to sequence up to eight channels of music, controlling the built-in module or external instruments via MIDI, in step-time using a musical-stave input screen.

Three versions of the CX5M were released. The first contained as its FM module the SFG-01, which could not receive external MIDI note information; it required a proprietary keyboard and only used its MIDI port was an output to send data to Yamaha's then-flagship DX7. The second version, the CX5M II (or CX7M/128 in Japan), upgraded the FM system to the SFG-05, which supported MIDI input and thus allowed the internal FM synth to be played by any external MIDI keyboard. There was also a later CX5M II with some smaller differences.

Later in 1986, Yamaha released the Yamaha FB-01 MIDI module, which was effectively an SFG-05 in a standalone, portable case.

References

External links
 
 
 

CX5M
MSX
Computer music